Jill Culiner (born September 13, 1945) is a Canadian folk artist, photographer and writer.

Personal life
Jill Culiner was born in New York City in 1945, and as an infant, she moved with her parents moved to Toronto. She is a Canadian citizen. She lives in France.

Work

She has had one-person shows of her photography and "boxes" (an art form she pioneered that depicts various social issues in 3-D) in France, Germany, Spain, Italy, Poland, Canada and Hungary.

Her exhibition (with texts) entitled "La Mémoire Effacée"  (The Vanished Memory, Az Elenyészett Emlék) concerning the First and Second World Wars, and the vanished Jewish communities of Europe, toured France, Canada and Hungary from 1996 to 2004 and was showcased in Budapest at the city's Holocaust Museum.

Culiner's first book was a photography book, Sans s'abolir pourtant (L'Echoppe, Paris, France 1992). She has also written novels. The first was Felicity's Power (Power of Love, Australia 2001), and her second novel,  Slanderous Tongue (Sumach Press, 2007), is a social critical murder-mystery set in a village in France. Culiner's third novel, A Sad Summer in Biarritz (Club Lighthouse Pub, 2017), is also set in France.

Culiner also wrote a non-fiction literary travel book, Finding Home: In the footsteps of the Jewish Fusgeyers (Sumach Press, 2004), which won the Joseph and Faye Tanenbaum Prize in Canadian Jewish History (Canadian Jewish Book Awards 2005), and was shortlisted for ForeWord Magazine Prize's 2004 Book of the Year Awards Essay and History category, 2004.

Culiner speaks to groups across Canada, the United States, France and Israel about various aspects of European Jewish history.

References 

1945 births
Living people
Artists from New York City
Artists from Toronto
American emigrants to Canada
Canadian women journalists
Canadian photographers
Canadian women photographers
Canadian women artists
21st-century Canadian novelists
Canadian non-fiction writers
Canadian women novelists
Journalists from Toronto
Yiddish-speaking people
Naturalized citizens of Canada
Writers from New York City
Writers from Toronto
21st-century Canadian women writers
Canadian women non-fiction writers
Jewish Canadian journalists